There are several stadiums in Romania with the name Stadionul Minerul:

 Stadionul Minerul (Lupeni)
 Stadionul Minerul (Moldova Noua)
 Stadionul Minerul (Motru)
 Stadionul Minerul (Valea Copcii)

Football venues in Romania